Area code 507 is the telephone numbering plan code for the southern fifth of Minnesota, including cities such as Rochester, Mankato, Worthington, Fairmont, Albert Lea, Northfield, and Austin.  It was the third area code created for use in the state in 1954, following the original 218 and 612.  It was created from the southwestern portion of 218 and the southern portion of 612.

In the original 1947 plan, area codes containing "0" (zero) as a middle digit were only assigned to states that were entirely covered by a single area code.  Area code 507, along with area code 606 in Kentucky and area code 607 in New York, were the first area codes with a middle digit of "0" to be assigned to states that were covered by more than one area code.

The region was directly bordered by 612 (to the north) until that area code was divided in the 1990s.  The western half of 507 bordered area code 320 starting in 1996, and then later came to border also area code 651 (1998) and area code 952 (2000).  The northern border of 507 was modified slightly so that expanding communities in and near the Twin Cities would be more closely linked with that region by telephone.  612 has now shrunk down to include just Minneapolis and a few surrounding suburbs, and no longer borders 507. Relief of 507 will likely be necessary by late 2024, likely as the first overlay in Minnesota, as 507 is expected to exhaust by early 2025.

Cities and communities within 

 Adams
 Adrian
 Albert Lea
 Amboy
 Arlington
 Austin
 Blooming Prairie
 Blue Earth
 Brownsdale
 Byron
 Caledonia
 Canby
 Cannon Falls
 Chatfield
 Currie
 Dexter
 Dodge Center
 Dovray
 Dundas
 Eagle Lake
 Edgerton
 Elgin
 Ellendale
 Eyota
 Fairfax
 Fairmont
 Faribault
 Fountain
 Franklin
 Fulda
 Gaylord
 Gibbon
 Grand Meadow
 Hadley
 Harmony
 Hayfield
 Hendricks
 Hokah
 Houston
 Ivanhoe
 Jackson
 Janesville
 Jeffers
 Kasson
 Kenyon
 La Crescent
 Lake Benton
 Lake Crystal
 Lake Wilson
 Lamberton
 Lanesboro
 Le Center
 Le Roy
 Le Sueur
 Lewiston
 Lewisville
 Lonsdale
 Luverne
 Madelia
 Madison Lake
 Mankato
 Mantorville
 Mapleton
 Marshall
 Medford
 Montgomery
 Morgan
 Morton
 Mountain Lake
 New Richland
 New Ulm
 Nicollet
 North Mankato
 Northfield
 Oronoco
 Owatonna
 Pemberton
 Pine Island
 Pipestone
 Plainview
 Preston
 Redwood Falls
 Rochester
 Rollingstone
 Rose Creek
 Rushford
 Rushford Village
 St. Charles
 St. Clair
 St. James
 St. Peter
 Slayton
 Sleepy Eye
 Springfield
 Spring Grove
 Spring Valley
 Stewartville
 Stockton
 Taopi
 Tracy
 Truman
 Tyler
 Vernon Center 
 Walnut Grove
 Waltham
 Wanamingo
 Waseca
 Waterville
 Wells
 West Concord
 Westbrook
 Windom
 Winnebago
 Winona
 Winthrop
 Worthington
 Wykoff
 Zumbrota

See also
 List of North American area codes

References

Area code history.  AreaCode-Info.com.
(2001). 1947 Area Code Assignment Map. GIF image at AreaCode-Info.com.

External links
NANPA: Minnesota area code map
List of exchanges from AreaCodeDownload.com, 507 Area Code

507
507